Gojko Žižić (born 21 January 1989) is a Montenegrin football defender.

References

External links
 
 Gojko Žižić stats at utakmica.rs
 Gojko Žižić stats at footballdatabase.eu

1989 births
Living people
Footballers from Podgorica
Association football central defenders
Montenegrin footballers
FK Crvena Stijena players
FK Kom players
FK Berane players
FK Dečić players
FK Čukarički players
FK Metalac Gornji Milanovac players
FK Sutjeska Nikšić players
FK Lovćen players
FK Banat Zrenjanin players
Olympic Azzaweya SC players
FK Jedinstvo Bijelo Polje players
Montenegrin First League players
Serbian SuperLiga players
Serbian First League players
Montenegrin Second League players
Montenegrin expatriate footballers
Expatriate footballers in Serbia
Montenegrin expatriate sportspeople in Serbia
Expatriate footballers in Libya
Libyan Premier League players